Mediator of RNA polymerase II transcription subunit 8 is an enzyme that in humans is encoded by the MED8 gene.

Function 

This gene encodes a protein that is one of more than 20 subunits of the mediator complex, first identified in S. cerevisiae, that is required for activation of transcription. The product of this gene also interacts with elongins B and C, and CUL2 and RBX1, to reconstitute a ubiquitin ligase. Five alternative transcripts encoding four isoforms have been described.

Interactions 

MED8 has been shown to interact with MED26.

References

Further reading